Up All Night is the first studio album by the American country music artist Kip Moore. It was released on April 24, 2012, by MCA Nashville. The album includes the number one single, "Somethin' 'Bout a Truck". In 2017, the album was certified Platinum in the US by the Recording Industry Association of America (RIAA).

Critical reception

Up All Night received generally positive reception from music critics. Metacritic assigns a "weighted average" metascore to albums based upon the reviews and ratings of selected independent reviewers, and the album score is a 67, which means it received "generally favorable" reviews. Stephen Thomas Erlewine of AllMusic gave it three stars, saying that it is "shameless in its attempt to win you over, and […] that eager-to-please nature winds up ingratiating whether you like it or not." Bobby Peacock of Roughstock praised Moore's voice and the production, saying that Moore "touches on so many country cornerstones […] in a believable fashion." A positive review also came from the Great American Country writer Daryl Addison, who said that it "carries a unique sound that fits somewhere between ramblin’ man storytelling, hook-driven contemporary country and atmospheric blue-collar rock." Country Standard Time'''s Michael Rampa was less favorable, criticizing the themes of some songs for "paying women with alcohol".

At Country Weekly, Jessica Nicholson gave a positive review of the album, remarking that "Kip's grainy, warm and confident vocal delivery ties the tales together into a believable tapestry. Brian Mansfield of USA Today rated the album two-and-a-half stars, observing that "Moore's blue-collar grit is welcome, but only on Reckless (Still Growin' Up) does he approach his heroes." Billboard rated the album a 3.5 out of 5, stating, "Moore spends much of his debut album, Up All Night, outlining the pleasures to be had from hot women and cold beverages." Taste of Country's Billy Dukes rated the album four stars, writing, "Like Eric Church before him, this singer may struggle to find consistent mainstream success, but it’s not because of a lack of high-quality material." At PopMatters, Dave Heaton rated the album six out of ten discs, saying, "It’s still generic, but takes a somewhat different turn, which is true for the entire LP."

In 2017, Billboard contributor Chuck Dauphin placed four tracks from the album on his top 10 list of Moore's best songs: "Beer Money" at number one, "Somethin' 'Bout a Truck" at number three, "Hey Pretty Girl" at number five and "Faith When I Fall" at number ten.

Track listing

Personnel
Adapted from the Up All Night'' liner notes.

Musicians
 Mike Brignardello – bass guitar
 Adam Browder – electric guitar
 Steve Bryant – bass guitar
 Howard Duck – keyboards
 Mike Durham – electric guitar
 Tommy Harden – drums
 Brett James – background vocals
 Charlie Judge – keyboards
 Troy Lancaster – acoustic guitar, electric guitar
 Dave Lapsley – electric guitar
 Rob McNelley – electric guitar
 Kip Moore – acoustic guitar, lead vocals, background vocals 
 Mike Rojas – keyboards
 Scotty Sanders —steel guitar
 Scott Williamson – drums

Technical
 Craig Allen – design
 Drew Bollman – assistant engineer
 Nick Brophy – mixing
 Joe Fisher – A&R
 Ben Fowler – engineer
 Mike "Frog" Griffith – project coordination
 Brett James – engineer, producer
 Nate Lowery – project coordination
 Joe Martino – assistant engineer
 Andrew Mendelson – mastering
 Justin Niebank – engineer
 Stephen Shepherd – photography
 Jessica Wardwell – photography

Chart performance

Weekly charts

Year-end charts

Singles

Certifications

References

2012 debut albums
Kip Moore albums
MCA Records albums
Albums produced by Brett James